The Hellenic Ministry of Foreign Affairs is a government agency of Greece. The Minister for Foreign Affairs controls the agency. The ministry has its headquarters in Athens.

The incumbent minister is Nikos Dendias in the Cabinet of Kyriakos Mitsotakis.

History

The Ministry for Foreign Affairs was first established in 1822 by the First National Assembly at Epidaurus as the Secretariat for External Affairs. In 1844, it was officially designated the Ministry for Foreign Affairs.

Leadership
 Minister for Foreign Affairs: Nikos Dendias
 Alternate Minister for European Affairs: 
 Deputy Minister for Economic Diplomacy and Openness: 
 Deputy Minister for Greeks Abroad: Andreas Katsaniotis

See also

 List of foreign ministers of Greece
 Minister for Foreign Affairs (Greece)

References

External links
  

 
1828 establishments in Greece
Government buildings in Athens
Foreign Affairs
Greece